Hebei North University (abbreviation: HBNU or HebeiNU; ; Héběi běifāng xuéyuàn) is a multi-faculty university in Zhangjiakou, Hebei, China under the provincial government.

Hebei North University is a provincially administrated multi-faculty university, which offers Bachelors Academic Degree programs and Master Academic Degree programs. The University was founded in May 2003 after approval by the Ministry of Education. It comprises three former provincially administrated institutions of higher learning in Zhangjiakou:  
Zhangjiakou Medical College (ZJKMC)
Zhangjiakou Teachers College (ZJKTC)
Zhangjiakou Advanced Post-secondary Agriculture School (ZJKAPAS)
It is the only multi-faculty university in the north of Hebei Province.

Social Pages 
Facebook: https://www.facebook.com/hebeinorthuniversitymedicine/
Twitter: https://twitter.com/HebeiNorthUni
Instag/hebei_north_university/

Teaching Departments
Basic Medical College
College of Medical Laboratory
Traditional Chinese Medicine
Department of Pharmacy
Department of Literature
College of Science
School of Economics and Management
School of Foreign Languages
College of Fine Arts
School of Information Science and Engineering
College of Law and Politics
College of Animal Science and Technology
College of Agriculture and Forestry Science and Technology
College of Continuing Studies
First Clinical Medical College
Second Clinical Medical College
Third Clinical Medical College
Public Physical Education Department
Department of Marxist Theory Education
Academy for Performing Arts

There are also three teaching departments, two scientific research centers and eight affiliated teaching departments in the university. There is also an International Center in Hebei North University.

References

3. ^ http://www.dawn.com/news/1143470

External links 
Chinese Homepage
English Homepage

Universities and colleges in Hebei
Educational institutions established in 2003
Zhangjiakou
2003 establishments in China